Jose Gameiro is a Paralympic athlete from Portugal competing mainly in category T11 sprint events.

He competed in the 2000 Summer Paralympics in Sydney, Australia. There he went out in the first round of the men's 200 metres - T11 event, went out in the quarter-finals of the men's 400 metres - T11 event and a gold medal in the men's 4 x 400 metre relay - T13 event

References

External links
 
Dom 
Paralympic athletes of Portugal
Athletes (track and field) at the 2000 Summer Paralympics
Paralympic gold medalists for Portugal
Living people
Medalists at the 2000 Summer Paralympics
Year of birth missing (living people)
Paralympic medalists in athletics (track and field)
Portuguese male sprinters
Visually impaired sprinters
Paralympic sprinters
Blind people
Portuguese people with disabilities
 ingos Ramião at the International Paralympic Committee